The Subprefecture of Sapopemba is one of 32 subprefectures of the city of São Paulo, Brazil. It comprises one district: Sapopemba. It is divided into 51 neighborhoods and its population density is 21,076 inhabitants/km2. This subprefecture was founded in 2013 from a territory of the Subprefecture of Vila Prudente, which makes it the youngest subprefecture of the city of São Paulo.

References

Subprefectures of São Paulo